Jacob Koopee Jr. (March 31, 1970-June 2011), also known as Jacob Nampeyo Koopee, was an American Hopi/Tewa potter and  artist.

Exhibitions 
 2018 Hopi Visions: Journey of the Human Spirit, Dallas Museum of Art 
 2005 Heard Museum- Elegance From Earth: Hopi Pottery Phoenix, Arizona
 2005 Heard Museum West- Buggin' Art: Surprise, Arizona
 2005 Heard Museum West: Our Stories, American Indian Art and Culture. Surprise, Arizona

Collections 
Birmingham Museum of Art
Dallas Museum of Art
Eiteljorg Museum, Indianapolis
Fine Arts Museums of San Francisco
Heard Museum, Phoenix, Arizona

References

External links 
https://www.heardguild.org/more-best-of-show-winners/

1970 births
2011 deaths
20th-century American artists
21st-century American artists
Native American artists
Hopi culture